Maybe Baby is a 7 Inch EP by American country band Blitzen Trapper, released on April 16, 2011.

Track listing
 "Maybe Baby"
 "Soul Singer"

References

2011 albums
Blitzen Trapper albums